A beehive is a structure in which bees live and raise their young.

Beehive and Bee Hive may also refer to:

Places and buildings

United Kingdom
 The Beehive, one of the pubs and inns in Grantham, Lincolnshire
 Beehive, Gatwick Airport, a building at London Gatwick Airport
 The Beehive, Marylebone, pub in London
 Beehive house, a type of stone building in Scotland and Ireland

United States
 The Bee Hive, nickname of Braves Field, a baseball park in Boston, Massachussetts
 Bee Hive, Alabama, a neighborhood in Alabama
 Beehive, Kentucky, an unincorporated community
 Beehive Geyser, a geyser in Yellowstone National Park
 Beehive House, a historic home in Salt Lake City, Utah
 Beehive State, the state nickname of Utah

Elsewhere
 The Beehive (Alberta), a mountain in Banff National Park, Canada
 Beehive (New Zealand), a wing of the New Zealand Parliament Buildings
 Beehive Corner or Beehive Building, a Neo-gothic building in Adelaide, South Australia
 Beehive tomb, a style of Mycenaean tomb from the Bronze Age
 Clochán or beehive hut, an ancient Irish dry stone structure

Film and television
 The Beehive (1975 film), an Iranian Persian film
 The Beehive (1982 film) (La colmena), a Spanish film
 Beehive (TV series), a 2008 UK comedy series

Music
 Bee Hive Records, a jazz record label
 Beehive (band), an electronic rock duo from Seattle, Washington
 Bee Hives, an album by Broken Social Scene
 Beehive Live, an album by Paul Gilbert
 "Beehive", a song by The Pillows

Military
 Beehive (anti-aircraft shell), a weapon used by the Japanese Navy in World War II
 Beehive anti-personnel round, a type of anti-personnel artillery shell used by the US in the Vietnam War
 Beehive, a codename for units of the Szare Szeregi during World War II in Poland

Computing
 Beehive Forum, Internet forum software
 Apache Beehive, a Java application development framework
 Oracle Beehive, a set of collaboration tools replacing Oracle Collaboration Suite

Other uses
 Beehive (hairstyle), a hairstyle shaped like a beehive
 Beehive (LDS Church), a 12- or 13-year-old participant in the Young Women organization of The Church of Jesus Christ of Latter-day Saints
 The Bee-Hive (journal), a 19th-century British trade union newspaper
 Beehive burner, a conical wood waste burner
 Beehive Cluster, a cluster of stars
 Beehive stone, a conical rock formation found in Hungary
 Beehive fireworks, a pyrotechnic launch system used in the Feng Pao celebration of Yanshuei District in Tainan, Taiwan

See also

 "Beyhive" (or "The Beyhive"), a term used to refer to fans of American R&B singer Beyoncé

 De Bijenkorf, a Dutch department store chain

 Hive (disambiguation)
 La Colmena (disambiguation)
 La Ruche (disambiguation)